The 2022–23 Egyptian Second Division is the 43rd and last edition of the Egyptian Second Division, the top Egyptian semi-professional level for football clubs, since its establishment in 1977. The season started on 11 October 2022, and is expected to conclude on 23 June 2022. Fixtures for the 2022–23 season were announced on 2 October 2022.

In 2021, the Egyptian Football Association announced that the 2022–23 season will be the last edition of the competition, and that it will be replaced with two leagues called Second Division A (professional league, second tier) and Second Division B (semi-professional league, third tier) starting from the 2023–24 season.

Format
The league consists of 48 teams divided into 3 groups of 16 teams each, with each group covering different parts of Egypt:
Group A for teams from Upper Egypt and eastern governorates.
Group B for teams from Greater Cairo, and central and north-eastern governorates.
Group C for teams from Alexandria and northern governorates.

The top team from each group will earn promotion to the next edition of the Egyptian Premier League. Teams finishing from 2nd to 5th place in each group will qualify to the newly-created Egyptian Second Division A, and teams that finish from 7th to 15th place in all groups will be relegated to the new third-tier league Egyptian Second Division B, while the last-placed team from each group will be relegated to the Egyptian Third Division.

A special one-leg play-offs consisting of teams finishing 6th in each group will be held on neutral grounds, where the top two teams will qualify to the Second Division A and the last team will drop to the Second Division B.

Teams
Team name followed with ↓ indicates the team was relegated from the 2021–22 Egyptian Premier League.
Team name followed with ↑ indicates the team was promoted from the 2021–22 Egyptian Third Division.
Team name followed with ↔ indicates the team was transferred to a different group from the previous season.

Group A
Al Aluminium
Asyut Cement↑
Asyut Petroleum
Dayrout
Faiyum
El Gouna↓
KIMA Aswan
La Viena↑
Al Madina Al Monawara
Mallawi
El Minya
Misr Lel Makkasa↓
MS Tamya
Muslim Youths (Qena)↑
Al Nasr Lel Taa'den↑
Telephonat Beni Suef

Group B
Eastern Company↓
El Entag El Harby
Kahraba Ismailia↑
Media↔
Al Mostaqbal↑
Al Nasr
Al Obour↑
Petrojet
Porto Suez
El Qanah
El Sekka El Hadid
Suez
Telecom Egypt
Tersana
Wadi Degla
ZED

Group C
Abou Qir Fertilizers
Baladeyet El Mahalla
Dikernis
Gomhoriat Shebin↑
Al Hammam
Al Hilal (El Dabaa)↑
Ittihad Nabarouh↑
Kafr El Sheikh
Al Magd
El Mansoura
Al Masry (Al Saloum)
Olympic Club
Pioneers
Proxy↑
Sporting Alexandria
Tanta↑

Results

Group A

Group B

Group C

Play-offs

Number of teams by governorate

References

Egyptian Second Division seasons
Egypt
Egyptian Second Division